Pustki may refer to:

Places
Pustki, Masovian Voivodeship (east-central Poland)
Pustki, Pomeranian Voivodeship (north Poland)
Pustki, Puck County in Pomeranian Voivodeship (north Poland)
Pustki, Tczew County in Pomeranian Voivodeship (north Poland)
Pustki, Warmian-Masurian Voivodeship (north Poland)

Music
Pustki (band), Polish alternative rock band